Juan Mirangels (15 August 1916 – 27 April 1991) was a Spanish sailor. He competed in the Dragon event at the 1960 Summer Olympics.

References

External links
 

1916 births
1991 deaths
Spanish male sailors (sport)
Olympic sailors of Spain
Sailors at the 1960 Summer Olympics – Dragon
Sportspeople from Barcelona